Rogue Trader is a 1999 British biographical drama film written and directed by James Dearden and starring Ewan McGregor and Anna Friel. The film centers on the life of former derivatives broker Nick Leeson and the 1995 collapse of Barings Bank. It was based on Leeson's 1996 book Rogue Trader: How I Brought Down Barings Bank and Shook the Financial World.

Plot
Rogue Trader tells the true story of Nick Leeson, a young employee of Barings Bank who after a successful spell working for the firm's office in Indonesia is sent to Singapore as General Manager of the Trading Floor on the SIMEX exchange. The movie follows Leeson's rise as he soon becomes one of Barings' key traders. However, everything isn't as it appears – through the 88888 error account, Nick is hiding huge losses as he gambles away Barings' money with little more than the bat of an eyelid from the powers-that-be back in London.

Eventually the losses mount up to well over £800 million and Nick, along with his wife Lisa, decide to leave Singapore and escape to Malaysia. Nick doesn't realise the severity of his losses until he reads in the newspaper that Barings has gone bankrupt. They then decide to return to London but Nick is arrested en route in Frankfurt. Nick is extradited to Singapore where he is sentenced to six and a half years in jail and is diagnosed with colon cancer. Because of this, he did not complete his sentence.

Cast
 Ewan McGregor as Nick Leeson
 Anna Friel as Lisa Leeson
 Pip Torrens as Simon Jones
 Tim McInnerny as Tony Hawes
 Nigel Lindsay as Ron Baker
 John Standing as Peter Baring
 Lee Ross as Danny Argyropoulos
 Yves Beneyton as Pierre Beaumarchais
 Betsy Brantley as Brenda Granger
 Caroline Langrishe as Ash Lewis
 Ivan Heng as The Bartender
 Rob Lemming as Trader #3

Release and distribution
Rogue Trader was released on 25 June 1999 in the United Kingdom and the United States. It was distributed by Pathé in the United Kingdom and Cinemax in the United States. It flopped at the box office, earning less than £1,000,000 in the UK.

Music
During a bar scene, the Blur song "Song 2" is heard playing. This is an anachronism as the song was not released until three years after the scene was set.

Reception
Rogue Trader was poorly received by critics, and the film holds a 30% rating on Rotten Tomatoes based on 23 reviews.

References

External links

 
 
 

1999 films
1990s biographical drama films
1999 crime drama films
British biographical drama films
British crime drama films
1990s business films
Trading films
Films based on non-fiction books
Films directed by James Dearden
Films set in Singapore
Films shot in Singapore
Films shot in Indonesia
Films shot at Pinewood Studios
Wall Street films
Crime films based on actual events
Drama films based on actual events
Films set in 1995
1990s English-language films
1990s British films